This glossary of climate change is a list of definitions of terms and concepts relevant to climate change, global warming, and related topics.

0–9

A

B

C

D

E

F

G

H

I

K

L

M

N

O

P

R

S

T

U

V

W

Y

See also

 Index of climate change articles
 Climate change acronyms
 Glossary of environmental science
 Glossary of meteorology
 Scientific opinion on climate change
 Timeline of environmental history

References

External links
 The Climate Dictionary: An everyday guide to climate change by United Nations Development Programme
 "The Words You Need To Know To Talk About Climate Change Today", dictionary.com (archive)
 IPCC,2021: AR6 WGI AnnexVII: Glossary
 
 Environmental Terminology Discovery Service — EEA (multilingual environmental glossary in 28 languages: ar, bg, cs, da, de, el, en, es, et, eu, fi, fr, hu, is, it, lt, lv, mt, nl, no, pl, pt, ro, ru, sk, sl, sv, tr)

Climate change

Wikipedia glossaries using description lists